Justin Montrel Griffith (born July 21, 1980) is an American former fullback in the National Football League. He was drafted by the Atlanta Falcons in the fourth round of the 2003 NFL Draft. He played college football at Mississippi State.

Griffith has also played for the Oakland Raiders, Seattle Seahawks and Houston Texans.

Early life
Justin Montrel Griffith was born on July 21, 1980, in Magee, Mississippi.

Playing career

Atlanta Falcons
Griffith was drafted by the Atlanta Falcons in the fourth round (121st overall) of the 2003 NFL Draft. He played four seasons with the team before becoming a free agent following the 2006 season.

Oakland Raiders
After playing two seasons for the Oakland Raiders, Griffith was released on February 23, 2009.

Seattle Seahawks
Griffith was signed by the Seattle Seahawks on April 27, 2009. The move reunited him with Seahawks head coach Jim Mora and offensive coordinator Greg Knapp, who were the head coach and offensive coordinator of the Atlanta Falcons during much of Griffith's time with the team.

Griffith was released on October 3, 2009, to make room for Kyle Williams who was signed off the practice squad.

Houston Texans
Griffith was signed by the Houston Texans on June 16, 2010.

Coaching career

Seattle Seahawks
He was a season-long coaching intern with the Seattle Seahawks for the 2011 season.

Oakland Raiders
In February 2012, Griffith returned to the Raiders, this time as an offensive quality control coach.

References

External links

Oakland Raiders bio
Seattle Seahawks bio

1980 births
Living people
People from Magee, Mississippi
Players of American football from Mississippi
American football fullbacks
Mississippi State Bulldogs football players
Atlanta Falcons players
Oakland Raiders players
Seattle Seahawks players
Houston Texans players
Seattle Seahawks coaches
Oakland Raiders coaches
Ed Block Courage Award recipients